Donald Richard Gibb (born August 4, 1954) is an American actor, best known for his roles as the hulking, dimwitted fraternity brother Ogre in several installments of the Revenge of the Nerds film series, as Kumite fighter Ray Jackson in Bloodsport, and as Leslie "Dr. Death" Krunchner on the HBO sitcom 1st & Ten.

Life and career 
Raised in California, Gibb attended Notre Dame High School in Sherman Oaks, California. Upon graduation he went to the University of New Mexico on a basketball scholarship, where he joined Phi Delta Theta fraternity. He then transferred to University of San Diego to play football. Don Gibb played basketball for the University of San Diego team on scholarship. Gibb played briefly for the San Diego Chargers before suffering an injury in an automobile accident, which led him to turn to acting, beginning with small, uncredited roles in Stripes and Conan the Barbarian. He received recognition in a small role in Lost in America, playing an ex-convict who picks up a hitchhiking main character, with a review stating that his casting was one of several in the film showing that director Albert Brooks had "a rare knack for filling supporting roles with exactly the right person, however unlikely that person would seem to be for that particular role".

Gibb is best known for his Ogre character portrayed first in Revenge of the Nerds and later in Revenge of the Nerds II: Nerds in Paradise and Revenge of the Nerds IV: Nerds in Love. Chugging beer from a trophy, throwing nerds off fraternity buildings and competing in belching contests, Gibb gleefully played up his former days as a college football jock. Gibb "experienced a life makeover" between the first and second films in the series, objecting to a proposed scene in the second film in which the script called for the character "to threaten somebody with a piece of wood", with Gibbs saying "I personally didn't want to be associated with that kind of action, and I didn't think Ogre would do it, either".

Gibb's other famous recurring role was in a string of martial arts pictures. As an American entrant named Ray Jackson, he starred alongside Jean-Claude Van Damme in Bloodsport, and alone in the 1996 sequel Bloodsport II: The Next Kumite. Gibb has appeared in more than 25 movies including Jocks and Amazon Women on the Moon. Subsequently, he also played a small role in the PC game Zork: Grand Inquisitor, as the man in the third portal with Lucy; and can be seen in a brief role in the film Hancock, starring Will Smith. Gibb gained notoriety on HBO's 1st & Ten, as Leslie "Dr. Death" Krunchner, a linebacker. Gibb played the role from 1984 until 1991, making him one of the few members of the fictional California Bulls to last the entire seven-year run. After, he played the illiterate biker Scab on the 1992 Fox sitcom Stand By Your Man, which co-starred Melissa Gilbert and Rosie O'Donnell, and played small roles in Quantum Leap, MacGyver, Magnum P.I., Night Court, Cheers, Renegade, The X-Files, The A-Team, Step by Step and Early Edition.

Gibb is the spokesman and co-owner for Chicago bar Trader Todd's, through which Gibb is marketing "Ogre beer", named after his iconic character in Revenge of the Nerds. In 2018, Gibb joined Revenge of the Nerds castmates Robert Carradine and Andrew Cassese in an interview at the Niagara Falls Comic Con.

Filmography

Film

Television

Video games

References

External links 
 
 
 

1954 births
Male actors from New York City
American male film actors
American male television actors
Living people
University of New Mexico alumni
New Mexico Lobos men's basketball players
San Diego Toreros men's basketball players
San Diego Toreros football players